Turing equivalence may refer to:

 As related to Turing completeness, Turing equivalence means having computational power equivalent to a universal Turing machine
 Turing degree equivalence (of sets), having the same level of unsolvability

See also
 Turing machine equivalents
 Turing test (disambiguation)